Andrew Tuala (born 9 March 1991 in Australia) is an Australian rugby union player who plays for the New South Wales Waratahs in Super Rugby. His regular playing position is hooker, however he can also play prop. He has signed for the Waratahs squad in 2019. He also plays for the LA Giltinis in Major League Rugby (MLR).

Reference list

External links
Rugby.com.au profile
itsrugby.co.uk profile

1991 births
Australian rugby union players
Australian sportspeople of Samoan descent
Living people
Rugby union hookers
Melbourne Rising players
Rugby union props
Greater Sydney Rams players
New South Wales Waratahs players
New South Wales Country Eagles players
LA Giltinis players
Samoan rugby union players
Samoa international rugby union players
Houston SaberCats players